Nymphoides balakrishnanii is an aquatic plant in the  Menyanthaceae, endemic to lateritic plateaus of the southern Western Ghats of India.

Distribution
This  species is restricted to a seasonal pond in the lateritic hillocks of Koovapara, Kasaragod, Kerala, India.

Etymology
The species is named to honor Mr. V. C. Balakrishnan, a dedicated conservation biologist in Northern Kerala.

References

balakrishnanii
Freshwater plants
Kasaragod district
Flora of Kerala